Chalarus longicaudis is a species of fly in the family Pipunculidae.

Distribution
Belgium, France, Sweden, Great Britain.

References

Pipunculidae
Insects described in 1992
Diptera of Europe